The Hound of Blackwood Castle (German: Der Hund von Blackwood Castle) is a 1968 West German crime film directed by Alfred Vohrer and starring Heinz Drache, Karin Baal and Horst Tappert. Based on a story by Edgar Wallace, it also draws inspiration from Arthur Conan Doyle's 1902 novel The Hound of the Baskervilles.

The film's sets were designed by the art directors Walter Kutz and Wilhelm Vorwerg. It was shot at the Spandau Studios in Berlin and on location around the city.

Synopsis
Scotland Yard are called in to investigate a series of killings at Blackwood Castle, apparently committed by a giant animal.

Cast

References

Bibliography 
 Bergfelder, Tim. International Adventures: German Popular Cinema and European Co-Productions in the 1960s. Berghahn Books, 2005.

External links 
 

1968 films
1960s mystery thriller films
German mystery thriller films
West German films
1960s German-language films
Films directed by Alfred Vohrer
Constantin Film films
Films set in England
Films shot at Spandau Studios
Films based on British novels
Films based on works by Edgar Wallace
1960s German films